Vladimir Parfyonov (born 17 June 1970) is a retired male javelin thrower from Uzbekistan. He set his personal best (84.52 metres) on 25 June 1995 in Palafrugell.

Achievements

References
IAAF Profile
sports-reference

1970 births
Living people
Uzbekistani male javelin throwers
Athletes (track and field) at the 1996 Summer Olympics
Olympic athletes of Uzbekistan
Athletes (track and field) at the 1994 Asian Games
Asian Games medalists in athletics (track and field)
Uzbekistani people of Russian descent
Asian Games silver medalists for Uzbekistan
Medalists at the 1994 Asian Games
20th-century Uzbekistani people